}}
| module             = 
| module2            = 
}}

Sheren Tang Shui-man (born 2 March 1966) is a Hong Kong actress. She is best known for her roles in the mega-hit Hong Kong TVB drama series War and Beauty, as well as La Femme Desperado, The Family Link, Rosy Business and No Regrets being the first Hong Kong actress to win the Best Actress Award in two consecutive years for the latter two.

She joined TVB in 1985, beginning her acting career as the female lead in the series Legend of the General Who Never Was (1985). Throughout the late 1980s, she rose to fame for her roles in many popular Hong Kong television series including wuxia dramas, New Heavenly Sword and Dragon Sabre (1986) and Ode to Gallantry (1989). She joined the television network ATV in 1996, filming several series including The Good Old Days (1996) and I Have A Date With Spring (1996).

Tang returned to TVB in 2000 and gained massive popularity for her role in War and Beauty (2004). She became the first actress to win TVB's My Favourite Powerhouse Actress Award two years in a row for this role and for The Threat of Love 2 (2003). Tang continued to outdo herself with her roles in Rosy Business (2009) and No Regrets (2010), which won her multiple awards in various countries. She has since appeared in Chinese series including New My Fair Princess (2011) and Star April (2017) before returning to Hong Kong television in 2018, filming a series for ViuTV released as Till Death Do Us Part (2019).

Early life and education 
Tang was born in 1966 when her mother was 17. She was left with her paternal grandparents as a baby and her parents divorced when she was 5 years old. She has one paternal half-sister. Her ancestral hometown is Nanhai, Guangdong. Tang attended Heep Yunn School from primary to high school. She rarely saw her parents when she was growing up and credited her conversion to Christianity in mending the estranged relationship between them later in her adulthood. She was later made president of the Hong Kong ACF (Artistes Christian Fellowship) where many Hong Kong artistes including her co-stars are also members.

In 1984, with a nomination from Andy Lau, Tang joined TVB's 13th training course, which was the first year TVB reduced the course from one year to half a year, splitting the course into two semesters. Tang was in the second semester along with Kitty Lai, Aaron Kwok, Maggie Shiu, and Michael Tse. Both her paternal grandparents passed within a couple years after she joined TVB training classes, with her grandfather passing away before her first drama had been broadcast.

In 1991, she went to the United States on a student visa to study interior design while continuing to film for TVB during her study breaks. During this time, she considered quitting the acting industry and moving to the United States permanently. However, when she returned in 1994, she ultimately decided to stay in Hong Kong and continue acting, as there were more interesting roles for women being offered at the time.

Career

1985-1995: Rise to fame at TVB 
Tang joined TVB's 13th training class. After her graduation in 1985, having only done a few commercials, Tang was cast in her first role as female lead in The Legend of the General Who Never Was. She went on to play first or second leading roles in the first few years of her career. Tang was cast in comedy series Happy Spirit where she acted alongside Carol Cheng as her younger sister. She starred as Chow chi-yeuk in New Heavenly Sword and Dragon Sabre, the 1986 adaptation of The Heaven Sword and Dragon Saber novel. She played Ching Yuet Yue in Police Cadet 1988, the second sequel to the widely popular Police Cadet series.

In 1989, she was featured in five series, three of which she starred alongside Roger Kwok; The Vixen’s Tale, I Do I Do, and The War Heroes. That same year she was cast in Ode to Gallantry, a Wuxia comedy based on the famous novel, where she starred as the character Ding Dong, reuniting with Police Cadet and New Heavenly Sword and Dragon Sabre costar Tony Leung. In 1990, she was cast as Fong Hei Tung in the series Friends and Lovers alongside Teresa Mo. Tang had let producers know that she was interested in working with Mo if given the opportunity prior to her casting and has stated that she is extremely grateful to have been cast in the series.

Her first supporting role was in the 1994 series The Intangible Truth where she starred as the sister to Roger Kwok’s character. The role was originally a guest role but subsequently became a significant character for the first half of the series. That same year, Tang played Tong Man Yung, best friend to Amy Chan’s character in popular series at the time, Fate of the Clairvoyant and starred as Kam Yik Lin in the comedy Filthy Rich.

In 1995, Tang played Joyce Yan, a forensic pathologist in File of Justice IV, the fourth instalment of the popular File of Justice series She also starred as ICAC officer Poon Wai Yan in the female-led drama Corruption Doesn't Pay, alongside Esther Kwan and Kiki Sheung.

1996-1999: Move to ATV 
In 1996, Tang signed a one-year contract with ATV, filming over 200 episodes in a span of one to two years. She starred in the 1996 adaptation of I Have A Date With Spring as Yiu Siu Deep. While the drama did not attract many viewers in Hong Kong, it was a huge success in Mainland China and the series has acquired a cult following. The role is considered one of her earlier representative works in China and Tang has continued to appear on dozens of variety programs and award shows performing songs from the series. She also reunited with costars Amy Chan, Kiki Sheung, and Maggie Shiu in one of the few popular ATV series The Good Old Days. She was also in the drama Interpol released in 1997. When her contract with ATV ended, she went on to act in several Taiwanese drama series. In 1998, she also appeared in Liang Po Po: The Movie as a foreign talent from Hong Kong that is engaged as an expert to impart knowledge of the triad to local gangsters like Liang Po Po. In 1999, Tang played a supporting role in the widely popular film Fly Me to Polaris.

2000-2008: Return to TVB and War and Beauty Popularity 
In 2000, she returned to TVB and starred in the weekend drama series The Threat of Love, which featured a new plot every episode. It grew to be popular among audiences, particularly for a weekend drama and was praised for its unique and progressive storylines. A sequel was released in 2003.

In 2001, Tang starred as a film director, Koi Ying-Jing in Screen Play and as Koo Yiu in the period drama Country Spirit. She went on to play supporting roles in the 2002 drama Good Against Evil and 2003 teen drama Aqua Heroes. Tang appeared as Su Tian Xin in the 2003 Taiwanese series Eternity: A Chinese Ghost Story which featured a large cast from Mainland China, Taiwan and Hong Kong.

In 2003, she won the My Favourite Powerhouse Actress Award (renamed Best Supporting Actress Award in 2005) at the TVB Anniversary Awards for the various roles she played in The Threat of Love 2. In 2004, she repeated her win for this award and also won one of the Favourite Television Character Awards for her role in War and Beauty.

Her acting in War and Beauty as Yu Fei (如妃), an initially favoured consort who eventually falls from power, was critically acclaimed, making her a hot favourite for the "Best Actress" award in 2004. However, she did not win, with the award being given to Gigi Lai instead. Voting was closed the night before the awards ceremony, with Tang leading by a landslide; thus many people concluded that the "Best Actress" award would surely go to her. Tang, instead, went home with the My Favourite Powerhouse Actress Award (now renamed as Best Supporting Actress award). This attracted a lot of public backlash, which prompted the ICAC to conduct investigations into the award show. Her loss is considered and remembered as one of the biggest snubs in the awards show history. Tang said that although she felt a tiny bit of disappointment at the time due to the abundance of support and stated "anyone can get affected by people's words", she also said that she performed her best which audiences recognized and that is already enough for her, comparing an award to a dessert, something that is extra.

She expanded her career to Mainland China in 2005 starring in two series. In the same year, Tang starred as So Sam in the costume drama The Prince’s Shadow and was also in the suspense film Slim Till Dead. She made an appearance in a flashback scene as the mother of Dragon played by Donnie Yen in the Hong Kong film Dragon Tiger Gate in 2006.

In 2006, Tang starred as a tough marketing CEO Hilda Hoi, in La Femme Desperado, which ranked number 1 in Hong Kong viewership ratings that year and won the Best Drama Award at the TVB Anniversary Awards. Tang was also nominated in the Best Actress Top 5 category and the My Favourite Female Television Role Top 5 category. In 2007, Tang went on to star in The Family Link where she was once again nominated in the Best Actress Top 5 category. The drama was ranked number 1 in average Hong Kong viewership ratings that year and was nominated for Best Drama at the TVB Anniversary Awards in 2007. That same year she also played a role in The Drive of Life, a TVB and CCTV joint grand production.

She starred as Kelly Yim in Your Class or Mine in 2008, reuniting with her File of Justice and Screenplay costar, Bobby Au Yeung. That same year, in addition to Rosy Business, Tang also filmed two Chinese series.

2009-2015: Rosy Business/No Regrets and Success in China 
In 2009, Tang's role as the 4th Wife (四奶奶) of a rice business owner in Rosy Business brought her much popularity, making her a hot favourite for the "Best Actress" award once again. However, it was said that TVB pushed back the award show to December so that grand production dramas Born Rich and Beyond the Realm of Conscience could be included in the nominations, diminishing Tang's chance of winning the award again. It was rumoured that TVB had initially wanted to promote female lead of Beyond the Realm of Conscience, Tavia Yeung, to become the Best Actress since Tang was not under a permanent contract with the network. However, Yeung openly said that if Tang did not get the "Best Actress" award, she would join the rest of the netizens to protest against TVB's decision. Fortunately, this time round, with TVB producer Catherine Tsang backing her, Tang was duly awarded her "Best Actress" award, much to the joy of Hong Kong citizens, whereby there was a petition signed by them for TVB to award Tang her long-overdue "Best Actress" award, failing which they will hold protests outside TVB City, the network's headquarters.

At the 2010 TVB Anniversary Awards which was held on 5 December 2010, thanks to her brilliant performance as Cheng Gau-Mui (鄭九妹), the complex daughter of a drug lord who plans to destroy her father's business from the inside, in the highly acclaimed indirect sequel to Rosy Business, No Regrets, Tang was once again seen as a hot favourite for the "Best Actress" award. In addition to strong backing from netizens, Tang was once again awarded the coveted "Best Actress" award, making her the first actress in Hong Kong to win this top award consecutively. Her acting and the role gained even more praise and critical acclaim than Rosy Business and established Tang as one of the most talented actresses from TVB. Tang has stated that her roles from Rosy Business and No Regrets are her favourite among all the characters she has played.

Already notable from War and Beauty and other TVB drama series, Tang and her co-star Wayne Lai gained even more popularity in Hong Kong, Mainland China, Taiwan, and Cantonese-speaking Asian communities overseas after the release of both hit series Rosy Business and No Regrets, with many considering them as one of the best onscreen duos on television. They have continued to work together occasionally for charity, public events, and variety shows over the years.

In 2011, she starred as the empress in the Mainland China series New My Fair Princess, a remake of the 1998 hit series My Fair Princess. This role won her a Huading Award for Best Supporting Actress in 2011. Her involvement in the series prevented her from taking a similar role in Chinese hit series Empresses in the Palace. The role went to co-star and friend Ada Choi, who was originally supposed to play Tang's character in War and Beauty. Tang calls their "character swap" fantastic and fate. Tang also clarified that she was only asked to join this series, and stated rumors of her rejecting a role in another hit series Story of Yanxi Palace were false, since she was never asked to join that series.

From 2012 to 2014, she also played a supporting role as Aunt Poise in The Four film trilogy where she reunited with 2005 suspense film Slim Till Dead costar and friend Anthony Wong.

In 2012, Tang starred as Bai Yuqin in the historical drama Allure Snow. In 2013, she starred in Love Is Not For Sale as the executive of a supermarket chain. Her contract expired with TVB after filming for the indirect sequel of War and Beauty, Beauty at War in 2012. In mid 2013, during promotional events and interviews for the series' release, Tang spoke about the difficulty of preparation due to script delays, particularly the lack of script available even on the day of shooting, which contributed to major anxiety and some physical health problems. She was diagnosed with dysautonomia during this time. Tabloids reported that this caused TVB to announce they will not renew her contract, even though Tang had previously said in 2012 before production began that the drama will be her last with the network for the time being and will be focusing her work in mainland China. Both Tang and the network have stated that reports were largely exaggerated and there was no conflict. Tang has always said that she is open to returning to TVB again if there is a role right for her.

In 2014, she starred in the costume comedy Cosmetology High playing historical figure, Wu Zetian, the only empress regnant (female emperor) of China.

Tang took approximately two years off from acting in 2014 and 2015 to focus on her health after being diagnosed with dysautonomia and minor thyroid problems. She has since made a full recovery.

2016-present: Return to Hong Kong television and New Management 
In 2016, after a short hiatus, Tang appeared in the film Heartfall Arises. She signed a one-year contract with Wong Cho Lam's new management Tailor Made Productions Limited which ended in 2017. In 2017, she was cast in Chinese dramas Star April and Once Given Never Forgotten, the latter which aired in 2021.

In 2018, Tang filmed her first Hong Kong series in 5 years Till Death Do Us Part. The series is her first with new broadcaster ViuTV and her first time acting alongside former TVB cast mates Sunny Chan and Bernice Liu. It was released in 2019.

In July 2021, Tang confirmed on Weibo that she has signed with Chinese management company Haohan Entertainment, with the company confirming she is part of the main cast in Chinese drama Women Walk The Line.

Sources had reported that Tang was asked to return to TVB for several dramas since 2015 after her contract ended in 2012 which included My Unfair Lady and Wonder Women, as the network tried to revamp after a couple years of low viewership and a hefty number of artistes and employees leaving. She instead made an appearance as a presenter at the TVB Anniversary Awards in 2016 and appeared on a couple of the network's talk show programmes in 2017. Tang stated over recent years that she tries to be mindful of health first, afraid of overworking herself again and would like to read at least a partial script before taking a new role. At the 2016 TVB Anniversary Awards, she joked that she cannot handle fei tze jai, literally a small piece of paper, which is a term used to describe writers writing the next lines on small pieces of paper for the cast while shooting on location due to unfinished scripts, once popular in Hong Kong television and film. In January 2021, TVB confirmed Tang's involvement in the fourth instalment of the Rosy Business franchise; accepting the gig before a script was written. However, as of early 2022, the project is still in development and the cast has yet to be confirmed after facing investment issues due to script issues and delays.

Filmography

TVB series

ATV series

Other series

Film

Music videos

Variety & reality programs

Discography

Soundtrack
I Have A Date With Spring (1995)

Advertisements & Endorsements 

 2009: La Prairie 泊妮化妆品
 2009: OTO Bodycare OTO揼揼鬆
 2010: Lion White Story Laundry Detergent 潔白物語洗衣粉（獅王潔白物語）
 2010-2020: Meiriki Japan 日本命力強骼素
 2010: Rohto Eye Moisturizer 樂敦養潤水
 2010: Easy Dance 纖形22
 2011: Blue Cross Insurance Hong Kong (with Wayne Lai) 藍十字保險
 2012: Salon De Pro 染髮劑
 2013: Noto Ginseng 樂道三七
 2016-present: Rohto 50の惠 養潤育髮精華素
 2020: SCHSA Medical Alarm Smartphone
 2020: SCHSA Medical Alarm Smartwatch (with Helena Law)

Awards and nominations

Other awards 

1986 華僑晚報 Overseas Chinese Daily News - Top 10 TV Stars
2004 My Favourite TV Character (voted by artistes/War and Beauty)
2004 娱乐满天星 - Most Popular Actress
2004 娱乐满天星 - Most Popular Villain (War and Beauty)
2004 Metro Radio - Best Classic Character (Grand Prize)
2004 Metro Radio - Best Actress
2004 Radio Television Hong Kong - Most Outstanding Actress
2004 Sina.com (Hong Kong) - Top 10 Outstanding People (4th position)
2005 FarmX Teen Power B-Day Party - Most Popular TV Personality Prize
2006 南方盛典 Southern China Award Ceremony - Best Actress (Love of Fate)
2007 Metro Radio - Best Newsworthy TV Queen
2009 My Favourite TV Character (voted by artistes/Rosy Business)
2009 Best Actress (voted by artistes/Rosy Business)
2010 My Favourite TV Character (voted by artistes/No Regrets)
2010 Best Actress (voted by artistes/No Regrets)
2010 Eileen Cha's Netizens' Choice - Best Actress
2010 Meiriki Japan Most Powerful Star
TVshow2010娛樂電視大獎 - My Favourite TV Female Character
2012 星尚大典 Best Film & Television Character
2012 Meiriki Japan Most Powerful Star
2013 卓展·Lady - Top 10 Female Characters with Positive Energy (Beauty At War)
2016 Meiriki Japan Most Powerful Star
2021 OK! Magazine Awards - OK! Yearly Favourite Actress
2021 iFeng 凤凰网 Fashion Choice - Tribute Actor of the Year
2021 Rayli 瑞丽网 - 2021-2022 Quality Actress

References

External links

Sheren Tang's Official Sina blog 
Sheren Tang's Official Sina Weibo 
Sheren Tang on Instagram
Sheren Tang on Facebook

1966 births
Living people
Hong Kong film actresses
Hong Kong television actresses
TVB veteran actors
Hong Kong Christians
Hong Kong Protestants
20th-century Hong Kong actresses
21st-century Hong Kong actresses